Ajmal Amirov (born 16 September 1985) is a Tajikistani athlete specializing in middle-distance events. He represented his country at 5 consecutive World Indoor Championships each time failing to advance past first round.

Competition record

Personal bests
Outdoor
1500 metres – 3:46.18 (Belgrade 2009)
3000 metres – 8:16.42 (Pune 2007)
5000 metres – 14:20.99 (Belgrade 2009)

Indoor
1500 metres – 3:51.75 (Moscow 2006)
3000 metres – 8:20.92 (Pattaya 2006)

External links

1985 births
Living people
Tajikistani male middle-distance runners
Tajikistani steeplechase runners
Place of birth missing (living people)
Athletes (track and field) at the 2006 Asian Games
Athletes (track and field) at the 2010 Asian Games
Male steeplechase runners
Tajikistani male long-distance runners
Asian Games competitors for Tajikistan
Competitors at the 2009 Summer Universiade